|}

Formerly known as the Grand International d'Ostende (1898), the race was renamed Grand Prix Prince Rose in honor of the great Belgian crack, Prince Rose. It is run in July at the Ostend racecourse on the occasion of the Belgian National Day. In 1931 Prince Rose beat the French mare Pearl Cap who went on to win the Prix de l'Arc de Triomphe later that year.

Palmarès from 1923 to 1988 
see : Thoroughbred database

Some famous winners 

 Le Capucin (1924)
 Prince Rose (1931)
 Corrida (1936 & 1937)
 Rheingold (1973)
 Argument (1980)

See also 
 GR I Grand Prix de Bruxelles

References

Prince Rose